Supanich Poolkerd (born 28 November 1997) is a Thai sprinter specialising in the 400 metres. She has won several medals at regional level.

International competitions

Personal bests

Outdoor
200 metres – 24.21 (Nakhon Ratchasima 2017)
400 metres – 54.55 (Kuala Lumpur 2017)
Indoor
400 metres – 55.85 (Ashgabat 2017)

References

1997 births
Living people
Supanich Poolkerd
Southeast Asian Games medalists in athletics
Supanich Poolkerd
Supanich Poolkerd
Athletes (track and field) at the 2018 Asian Games
Competitors at the 2015 Southeast Asian Games
Competitors at the 2017 Southeast Asian Games
Supanich Poolkerd
Competitors at the 2017 Summer Universiade
Competitors at the 2019 Summer Universiade
Supanich Poolkerd
Supanich Poolkerd